Biete Lehem is an underground monolith church carved into rock. It is located in Lalibela, Ethiopia. It was created during the Kingdom of Axum. It is part of UNESCO World Heritage Site at Lalibela. The name Biete Lehem is from Bethlehem Hebrew: בֵּית לֶחֶם (House of Holy Bread).

References 

Rock-Hewn Churches, Lalibela